The Baháʼí Faith in Mongolia dates back only to the 1980s and 1990s, as prior to that point Mongolia's Communist anti-religious stance impeded the spread of the religion to that country.  The first Baháʼí arrived in Mongolia in 1988, and the religion established a foothold there, later establishing a Local Spiritual Assembly in that nation.  In 1994, the Baháʼís elected their first National Spiritual Assembly. Though the Association of Religion Data Archives estimated only some 50 Baháʼís in 2005 more than 1,700 Mongolian Baháʼís turned out for a regional conference in 2009.

Early phase
In July 1989 Sean Hinton became the first Baháʼí to reside in Mongolia. He was named a Knight of Baháʼu'lláh, and his was the last name to be entered on the Roll of Honor placed at the Shrine of Baháʼu'lláh.  The first Mongolian, Ms. Oyundelger, joined the religion later in 1989.

Hinton was trained in Baroque Flute and Conducting at the Guildhall School of Music and Drama in London. Having conceived of the possibility of becoming a Knight of Baháʼu'lláh as a university student, he learned that Mongolia was one of the few countries not yet "opened" to the Baháʼí Faith. He won a scholarship from the British Council to study Mongolian flute music, and obtained a Mongolian residence visa. Arriving in December 1988, he remained in Ulaanbaatar one year, at one point guiding Ruhiyyih Khanum during her visit. Oyundelger, then 22, was a private English language student of Hinton's who gradually learned of his religion and embraced it just before his departure. After obtaining a master's degree in ethnomusicology from Cambridge University, Hinton returned to Mongolia—initially to the Mongolian Altai—and ultimately lived there for six years, abandoning an ethnomusicology doctorate. In recognition of his services to the country, he was appointed Honorary Consul-General of Mongolia - the sole representative in Australia for the Mongolian government.

In the late summer of 1992, Semira Manaseki, a British Baháʼí youth, and 2 youth members of the Marion Jack Teaching Project who were working mostly within Russia at the time, came to Mongolia to participate in a concerted effort to share the Baháʼí Faith with a wider range of Mongolians. After a concerted two-month effort, there were new Baháʼí communities in Darhkan and Erdennet, effectively tripling the size and location of the community at the time, which had been based solely out of Ulanbaatar. Members of the project stayed in the country until the following summer to help with consolidation efforts which resulted in the beginnings of a new community in Sainshand and eventually the first Mongolian Baháʼí Summer School in 1993.

In June 1995 the first Baháʼí national youth school was held in Mongolia.

A national community
Ruhi Institute courses begun in 1996 are credited by Baháʼí sources as resulting in 228 enrollments in one year, which raised the Baháʼí national population to some 500. A further program was initiated in June 2004 and in about a month resulted in 200 new declarations, including 60 "junior youth" (ages 11–14). Within a few weeks about 30 of these individuals had completed the first three books of the sequence and 137 children were participating in children's classes.

Regional conferences were called for by the Universal House of Justice 20 October 2008 to celebrate recent achievements in grassroots community-building and to plan their next steps in organizing in their home areas. Ulaanbaatar was the gathering place for more than 1,800 Baháʼís from Mongolia and Russia. More people than expected came from various regions of the country, including 408 individuals from Khövsgöl, 143 from Khentii Province, 160 from Uliastai, 120 from Sainshand, and 450 from the capital itself. More than 50 Baháʼís arrived from Russia. Continental Counselors Khursheda Porsayeva, Bijan Farid, and Delafruz Nassimova attended and Counselors Uransaikhan Baatar, herself Mongolian, and  Joan Lincoln, represented the Universal House of Justice. Mr. Tsedendambaa, Adviser to the President of Mongolia for Religious Affairs addressed the conference with a message of encouragement to the Baháʼís. Dr. Batsereedene, a former Minister of Health also spoke at the conference.

David Lambert (OBE), a British Baháʼí living in Mongolia, was honored for his services to the development of English language studies in Mongolia. In 2003 he was chairman of the National Spiritual Assembly of the Bahá'ís of Mongolia. He and his wife, Lois, are the longest serving volunteers in the British Voluntary Service Overseas organization.  He is a member of the first Arts Council of Mongolia and developed the Ulaanbaatar's University of Humanities English language library that is the most extensive in the country. He arranged for British publishers to donate many books and for the United Kingdom government to transport them to Mongolia. In 2008 Lois Lambert was awarded a medal as a State Honoured Citizen in recognition of her "invaluable intellectual contributions to the health sector of Mongolia through the training of medical professionals utilizing a positive participatory approach, excellent communication skills and demonstrating a high professional knowledge and exemplary ethics." (See below).

Since 2001 efforts of the Baháʼís have been informed by the FUNDAEC initiative in Colombia and there has been work toward translating the Hidden Words into Mongolian.

Community development
Since its inception the religion has had involvement in socio-economic development beginning by giving greater freedom to women, promulgating the promotion of female education as a priority concern, and that involvement was given practical expression by creating schools, agricultural coops, and clinics. The religion entered a new phase of activity when a message of the Universal House of Justice dated 20 October 1983 was released. Baháʼís were urged to seek out ways, compatible with the Baháʼí teachings, in which they could become involved in the social and economic development of the communities in which they lived. Worldwide in 1979 there were 129 officially recognized Baháʼí socio-economic development projects, while by 1987 there were 1482.

Mongolian Development Centre
The Mongolian Development Centre (MDC) was established in Ulaanbaatar, Mongolia, as a Baháʼí-inspired non-governmental organization established in April 1993 with the objective of translating the spiritual principles found in the Baháʼí Writings into practice for the betterment of Mongolian society. Working with local communities through programs centered on development and education, MDC contributes to a learning process aimed at the sustainable social, economic, and spiritual advancement of the country. One of the organization's areas of focus has been an early childhood development program with a character development curriculum to nurture moral reasoning in children between 3 and 6 years of age with training assistance for teachers of kindergarten classes. MDC also administers a junior youth program to foster the empowerment of 12- to 14-year-olds by assisting them to develop intellectual and moral capabilities that enable them to transform themselves and contribute to the upliftment of their communities. MDC began conducting the program in a few schools in 2005, and by 2007 the program had been adopted by 11 schools in Baganuur, Muron, Sainshand, and Ulaanbaatar, involving over 1,300 junior youth. The MDC also initiated a Community Capacity Development program that focuses on two initiatives: a gardening project offers courses in biointensive methods for growing vegetables (see below) and a Community Banking Program, aimed at increasing the financial resources available in a community and building local capacity to manage these resources by combining spiritual principles with practical considerations. In 2007, there were six community banks with some 100 members operating in two different locations in Mongolia. It is coordinating funding and resources in the UK between Baháʼí sources and others still in 2010.

Erdenbulgan gardening
The 1997 Human Development Report for Mongolia, published by the United Nations Development Programme, pointed to nutritional issues being a serious widespread concern pointing to a lack of fruits and vegetables being a key issue. Governmental and non-governmental organizations are keenly aware of the problems posed by the limited diet. The national government proclaimed 1993 as "food year". In May 1995, the Baháʼí community of Erdenbulgan began to talk about undertaking some sort of local social and economic development project, coming up with a list of possibilities that included establishing a bread bakery, erecting a cultural center, sponsoring English classes and starting a vegetable garden. After further consultation, the Baháʼís decided in 1996 that the vegetable garden was perhaps the easiest to undertake immediately - and perhaps the most needed. They got permission in 1997 from the municipality to fence off a quarter hectare of land near the Eg River. And knowing it needed help, the community reached outside itself, asking the national Baháʼí office in Ulaanbaatar for advice and assistance. Officials at the national office knew about the presence in the region of Mr. Megit, a Canadian agricultural specialist who is also a Baháʼí and who had been working in nearby Ulan Ude, Russia. They invited him to travel to Erdenbulgan and consult with them, which he did in April 1996. Partly because of what he saw, Mr. Megit decided to relocate to Mongolia in late 1996, where he joined the staff of the Mongolian Development Center (MDC), a national-level non-governmental organization established by a group of Baháʼís to provide various forms of technical assistance to local communities.  Maitar Tsend, the director of the Mongolian Horticultural Society, an independent NGO which has also launched its own campaign to encourage small-scale vegetable gardening,  drew attention to the project in Erdenbulgan as a model for all of Mongolia because of the way it has educated and empowered local people. "Before, during the Communist period, it was prohibited even to have a garden, because it was regarded as private initiative. So people don't think they can grow vegetables themselves or they think that growing cabbage is more difficult than raising sheep. But now things are changing very quickly, and the Erdenbulgan community has demonstrated this."

Teaching morals in Medical College
Dr. Byambaagiin Batsereedene, a former Minister of Health and the owner and director of the  Etugen Institute, a medical college in Ulaanbaatar where Baháʼís have been conducting classes in moral education through a Ruhi Institute course since 2007. In 2009, with a team of 14 Baháʼí facilitators, 400 students are following the course at the request of Dr. Batsereedene.

See also
 History of modern Mongolia
 Religion in Mongolia

References

Further reading

External links
Mongolian Baháʼí National Community

Religion in Mongolia
Mongolia